The following is a listing of affiliates for Rewind TV, a classic television network, which was launched on September 1, 2021. This is a listing of Rewind TV's confirmed affiliates, arranged by U.S. state. There are links to and articles on each of the stations, describing their local programming, hosts and technical information, such as broadcast frequencies. In most markets, Rewind TV operates on a digital subchannel of the main station listed.

Affiliates
Stations listed in bold are owned-and-operated.

References

External links
 Rewind TV affiliates

Rewind TV